Lazareto is an islet in the bay of Vathy, Ithaca, one of the Ionian Islands in Greece. , it had no resident population.

References

External links
Lazareto on GTP Travel Pages (in English and Greek)

Islands of the Ionian Islands (region)
Landforms of Ithaca
Islands of Greece